Tea Tulić (born 1978) is a Croatian writer. She was born in Rijeka. She is best known for her debut novel Kosa posvuda (Hair Everywhere) which received widespread acclaim. It has been translated into several European languages, including an English translation by Coral Petkovich.

References

Croatian writers
1978 births
Living people
Writers from Rijeka
Date of birth missing (living people)